The Indigenous peoples of the North American Southwest are those in the current states of Colorado, Arizona, New Mexico, Utah, and Nevada in the western United States, and the states of Sonora and Chihuahua in northern Mexico. An often quoted statement from Erik Reed (1964) defined the Greater Southwest culture area as extending north to south from Durango, Mexico to Durango, Colorado and east to west from Las Vegas, Nevada to Las Vegas, New Mexico. Other names sometimes used to define the region include "American Southwest", "Northern Mexico", "Chichimeca", and "Oasisamerica/Aridoamerica". This region has long been occupied by hunter-gatherers and agricultural people.

Many contemporary cultural traditions exist within the Greater Southwest, including Yuman-speaking peoples inhabiting the Colorado River valley, the uplands, and Baja California, O'odham peoples of Southern Arizona and northern Sonora, and the Pueblo peoples of Arizona and New Mexico. In addition, the Apache and Navajo peoples, whose ancestral roots lie in the Athabaskan-speaking peoples in Canada, entered the Southwest during the 14th and 15th century and are a major modern presence in the area.

List of Indigenous peoples

Ak Chin, Arizona
 Southern Athabaskan
Chiricahua Apache, New Mexico and Oklahoma
Jicarilla Apache, New Mexico
Lipan Apache, Texas
Mescalero Apache, New Mexico
Navajo (Navaho, Diné), Arizona and New Mexico
San Carlos Apache, Arizona
Tonto Apache, Arizona
Western Apache (Coyotero Apache), Arizona
White Mountain Apache, Arizona
Aranama (Hanáma, Hanáme, Chaimamé, Chariname, Xaraname, Taraname)
Coahuiltecan, Texas, northern Mexico
Cocopa, Arizona, northern Mexico
Comecrudo Texas, northern Mexico
Cotoname (Carrizo de Camargo)
Halchidhoma, Arizona and California
Hualapai, Arizona
Havasupai, Arizona
Hohokam, formerly Arizona
Karankawa, Texas
Kavelchadhom
La Junta, Texas, Chihuahua
Mamulique, Texas, northern Mexico
Manso, Texas, Chihuahua
Maricopa, Arizona
Mojave, Arizona, California, and Nevada
Pima, Arizona
Pima Bajo
Pueblo peoples, Arizona, New Mexico, Western Texas
Ancestral Pueblo, formerly Arizona, Colorado, New Mexico, Utah
Hopi-Tewa (Arizona Tewa, Hano), Arizona, joined the Hopi during the Pueblo Revolt
Hopi, Arizona
Keres people, New Mexico
Acoma Pueblo, New Mexico
Cochiti Pueblo, New Mexico
Kewa Pueblo (formerly Santo Domingo Pueblo), New Mexico
Laguna Pueblo, New Mexico
San Felipe Pueblo, New Mexico
Santa Ana Pueblo, New Mexico
Zia Pueblo, New Mexico
Tewa people, New Mexico
Nambé Pueblo, New Mexico
Ohkay Owingeh (formerly San Juan Pueblo), New Mexico
Pojoaque Pueblo, New Mexico
San Ildefonso Pueblo, New Mexico
Tesuque Pueblo, New Mexico
Santa Clara Pueblo, New Mexico
Tiwa people, New Mexico
Isleta Pueblo, New Mexico
Picuris Pueblo, New Mexico
Sandia Pueblo, New Mexico
Taos Pueblo, New Mexico
Ysleta del Sur Pueblo (Tigua Pueblo), Texas
Piro Pueblo, New Mexico
Towa people
Jemez Pueblo (Walatowa), New Mexico
Pecos (Ciquique) Pueblo, New Mexico
Zuni people (Ashiwi), New Mexico
Quechan (Yuma), Arizona and California
Quems
Solano, Coahuila, Texas
Tamique
Toboso
Tohono O'odham, Arizona and Mexico
Qahatika, Arizona
Tompiro
Ubate
Walapai, Arizona
Yaqui (Yoeme), Arizona, Sonora
Yavapai, Arizona
Tolkapaya (Western Yavapai), Arizona
Yavapé (Northwestern Yavapai), Arizona
Kwevkapaya (Southeastern Yavapai), Arizona
Wipukpa (Northeastern Yavapai), Arizona

List of Indigenous affiliated and related peoples 
Genízaros, originating from the Great Plains, recognized as an Indigenous group in the US state of New Mexico
Hispanos, most have mestizo ancestry, particularly in New Mexico
Californios, California (The Californias)
Hispanos of New Mexico (Santa Fe de Nuevo México)
Tejanos, Texas (Coahuila y Tejas)

History

The Pre-Columbian culture of the American Southwest and Northern Mexico evolved into three major archaeological culture areas, sometimes referred to as Oasisamerica.

The Ancestral Pueblo peoples, or Anasazi, culture was centered around the present-day Four Corners area. Their distinctive pottery and dwelling construction styles emerged in the area around 750 CE. Ancestral Pueblo peoples are renowned for the construction of and cultural achievement present at Pueblo Bonito and other sites in Chaco Canyon, as well as Mesa Verde, Aztec Ruins, and Salmon Ruins. 
The Hohokam tradition, centered on the middle Gila River and lower Salt River drainage areas, and extending into the southern Sonoran Desert, is believed to have emerged in approximately 200 CE. These people lived in smaller settlement clusters than their neighbors, and built extensive irrigation canals for a wide range of agricultural crops.  There is evidence the Hohokam had far-reaching trade routes with ancient Mesoamerican cultures to the south, and show cultural influences from these southerners.
 Mogollon peoples  lived in the southwest from approximately 200 CE until sometime between 1450 and 1540 CE. Mogollon archaeological sites are found in the Gila Wilderness, Mimbres River Valley, along the Upper Gila river, Paquime and Hueco Tanks, an area of low mountains between the Franklin Mountains to the west and the Hueco Mountains to the east.

In addition, three distinct minor cultures inhabited the eastern, western, and northern extremes of the area. From 1200 CE into the historic era a people collectively known as the La Junta Indians lived at the junction of the Conchos River and Rio Grande on the border of Texas and Mexico.  Between 700 and 1550 CE, the Patayan culture inhabited parts of modern-day Arizona, California and Baja California.  The Fremont culture inhabited sites in what is now Utah and parts of Nevada, Idaho and Colorado from 700 to 1300 CE.

Material Culture
Agriculture in the Southwest was based on the cultivation of maize, beans, squash and sunflower seeds. The Tepary bean Phaseolus acutifolius has been a staple food of Native peoples in the Southwest for thousands of years on account of their tolerance of drought conditions. They require wet soil to germinate but then prefer dry conditions, so they were generally grown on floodplains that would dry out after heavy rains.

Foraging for wild foods also played a major role in the ancient diet of Southwestern peoples. For example, the fruit and seeds of the Saguaro cactus were collected and eaten both fresh and dried, and made into preserves and drinks by tribes such as the Tohono O'odham and Pima. The flower buds of the Cholla cactus have also been collected and roasted in clay lined pits.  Another important food for Indigenous peoples living in mountainous areas of the Southwest are the seeds of the Pinyon pine, known as "pine nuts" or "piñóns." The nuts are traditionally a vital source of protein in the winter for the Ute and Paiute peoples.

The agave plant has historically been a vital food source, useful to Indigenous people in many ways. Agave hearts can be roasted and relished for their sweetness, and dried agave eaten during the winter months. The tough fibers of agave are used in making baskets and mats. In addition, agave is famously used for distilled spirits such as tequila and mezcal.

Indigenous peoples of the region have traditionally raised turkey and hunted deer, antelope and rabbit. After European contact they began to keep sheep, goats and cattle.

Society and culture

Contemporary Pueblo Indians continue to be organized on a clan basis for pueblo activities and curing ceremonies. The clans of the eastern Pueblos are organized into the Summer people and the Winter people (Tanoans) or as the Turquoise people and the Squash people. The western Puebloans are organized into several matrilineal lineages and clans. Many Pueblo peoples continue to practice the kachina (katsina) religion.

See also
Indigenous peoples of Mexico
Native Americans in the United States

References

External links 
 Patayan Map and Pottery
 People of the Colorado Plateau

Archaic period in North America
North American archaeology
History of indigenous peoples of North America
 
 
 
 
 
Mogollon culture
Pre-Columbian cultural areas
Oasisamerica cultures
Southwestern United States
North American Southwest